"How Can I Ease the Pain" is a song by American singer Lisa Fischer, from her album So Intense. It was produced by Narada Michael Walden with associate producer Louis Biancaniello. The hit song spent two weeks at number-one on the U.S. Billboard Hot R&B/Hip-Hop Songs chart. The song was sampled by rap group Three 6 Mafia for their hit "Late Nite Tip".

In 1992, the single won a Soul Train Music Award for Best R&B/Soul Single, Female and it also won a 1992 Grammy Award for Best Female R&B Vocal Performance. The song also peaked at number eleven on the pop charts.  This was Fischer's biggest and most well-known hit.

Charts

Weekly charts

Year-end charts

See also
List of number-one R&B singles of 1991 (U.S.)

References

1991 singles
Song recordings produced by Narada Michael Walden
Songs written by Narada Michael Walden
1991 songs
Elektra Records singles
Contemporary R&B ballads
Soul ballads
1990s ballads